Eric Lang may refer to:

 Eric M. Lang, game designer
 Eric Lang (ice hockey) (born 1975), ice hockey player and coach